WINA (1070 AM) is a news/talk/sports formatted broadcast radio station licensed to Charlottesville, Virginia, serving Charlottesville and Albemarle County, Virginia. WINA is owned and operated by the Charleston Radio Group subsidiary of Saga Communications.

History
WINA was granted its license to broadcast on October 10, 1949; the station signed on soon afterwards as a 1,000-watt daytimer on 1280 kHz with a full service format. Behind WCHV, it was the city's second radio station. It was owned by Charlottesville Broadcasting Corp. and had studios at 4th and East Main Streets in downtown Charlottesville. In the earliest advertisements, the station was branded as "The WINA!", implying a pronunciation as the word "winner". In modern times, the station's callsign is pronounced phonetically.

Network radio was still dominant in 1949, but there were no available networks with which to affiliate, and so WINA was to start entirely reliant on local programming. WCHV was affiliated with ABC, WJMA Orange was affiliated with Mutual, and CBS and NBC were available to some from WRVA and WMBG in Richmond, respectively. In 1951, it obtained a short-lived affiliation with the Liberty Broadcasting System. After LBS went under in 1952, WINA gained affiliations with Mutual and the Keystone Broadcasting System, a radio transcription network rebroadcasting major-network scripted programs to areas that lacked local affiliates. By then, the station had settled into a format of middle-of-the-road music, news, and scripted network programs.

WINA changed frequencies twice during this period. In 1954, it moved to 1450 kHz and gained permission to commence night operation at 250 watts, reducing daytime power to match. Two years later, it moved to 1400 kHz in order to increase back to 1 kW during the day.

In May 1957, Charlottesville Broadcasting merged with the James Madison Broadcasting Corporation, owners of WJMA. The combined entity was still known as Charlottesville Broadcasting Corp., and the stations were managed independently.  The two stations joined NBC together on October 1, 1958. WJMA was sold off in April 1961.

After eight years with NBC, WINA switched to CBS on October 30, 1966, an affiliation that lasts to the present day. This was concurrent with a change to 1070 kHz and another power upgrade to the current 5 kW day and night.

Laurence E. Richardson, former president of Post-Newsweek Stations, bought Charlottesville Broadcasting Corp. from Don Heyne in 1969.

In 1970, farm director Bill Ray began syndicating regional farm news reports in a network known as Agrinet. In the mid-1970s, this involved into the full-fledged Virginia Network, carrying news bulletins and Virginia Cavaliers sports. WINA spun off the network news operation in 1982, but remains the flagship of the Virginia Sports Radio Network.

As late as 1991, WINA's full service format (with the music having evolved to modern adult contemporary) was still the top rated station in Charlottesville, despite having multiple FM competitors. Starting in 1992, the station added satellite-fed talk in addition to some remaining adult contemporary programming. Around 1995, WINA eliminated its remaining music-formatted blocks and transitioned to a full news/talk format. The station now runs news in morning drive and locally produced talk in afternoon drive, with satellite-fed talk and CBS news bulletins filling the rest of the time.

Charlottesville Broadcasting concluded a merger deal with Eure Communications, owners of ratings rival WWWV (97.5 MHz) and WCHV (1260 kHz), in 1997. The FCC scrutinized the sale, as it would have resulted in common ownership of five stations – which it saw as a potential competition-killer in the small market. The sale proceeded after the new company was forced to spin off the two least-valuable properties, WCHV and WKAV (1400 kHz), to Clear Channel. Saga Communications bought Eure's three stations in 2004.

WINA added an FM translator on 98.9 MHz in November 2015. This translator is fed by an HD subchannel of co-owned WCNR (106.1 MHz). The translator augments WINA's reception in the city, as AM signals become increasingly difficult to receive due to electrical interference.

FM and television

In 1954, WINA began simulcasting on the city's first FM station, WINA-FM on 95.3 MHz. Like many early AM-FM combinations, the FM station was merely a relay for the AM station. In order to encourage unique FM programming, the FCC limited simulcasting on a co-owned AM-FM pair to twelve hours per day in 1964. WINA-FM was initially exempt because the rule only applied to large markets, but the FCC made programming separation a condition of Richardson's purchase of Charlottesville Broadcasting. The FM station began airing a separate day (except for a morning drive simulcast) in 1971, followed quickly by a callsign change to WQMC. This station is now WQMZ on 95.1 MHz.

Charlottesville Broadcasting was also the first permittee of television channel 29, which was duly given the callsign WINA-TV. The construction permit was issued on July 13, 1965, and no further actions besides two extensions are recorded. During the company's 1969 sale, then-owner Don Heyne indicated he no longer wanted to build out the permit and could not find a buyer. Richardson also indicated that he did not want to purchase it, but was required to by the purchase agreement. As FCC rules only allow the sale of a permit to an entity that intends to build, the board ordered the permit cancelled and the $55,000 Charlottesville Broadcasting invested into it deducted from the sale price. WVIR, which was to occupy channel 64, then moved to channel 29 and signed on in 1973.

Programming
WINA's normal broadcast days consist of a block of news in morning drive and local and satellite-delivered talk for the remainder of the day. The station is affiliated with CBS Radio News, broadcasting hourly bulletins and the CBS World News Roundup at 7 p.m. Syndicated hosts heard on weekdays are Mike Gallagher, Laura Ingraham, Mark Levin, and John Batchelor.

WINA is the flagship station of the Virginia Sports Radio Network, originating the network's live coverage of all men's basketball and football games, as well as weekly coaches' shows. The coaches' shows are scheduled in a 54-minute timeslot, from 7:06 p.m. to 8 p.m., to accommodate the World News Roundup. WINA also carries selected baseball, women's basketball, and men's and women's lacrosse games. The station produces live coverage of the Charlottesville Ten Miler footrace in late March, with commentary duties handled by current Voice of the Cavaliers John Freeman.

Translator
WINA is relayed by one FM translator. The translator launched on November 29, 2015.

References

External links
NewsRadio 1070 and 98-9FM WINA Online

1949 establishments in Virginia
News and talk radio stations in the United States
Sports radio stations in the United States
Radio stations established in 1949
INA
Mass media in Charlottesville, Virginia